Eleanor Glencross (11 November 1876 – 2 May 1950) was an Australian feminist and housewives' advocate.

Glencross was born Eleanor Cameron in Sydney to unionist and politician Angus Cameron and Eleanor, née Lyons. She attended Cleveland Street Public School and Mis Somerville's Ladies' College and worked for the Liberal and Reform Association. She became general secretary and organiser of the Australian Women's National League in 1911 before returning to Sydney in 1913 to work for the Liberal Association of New South Wales. On 14 March 1917 she married Andrew William Glencross at St Stephen's Presbyterian Church, moving to Stawell later that year and vigorously supporting the pro-conscription campaign.

Glencross was appointed honorary director of the prohibitionist Strength of Empire Movement in 1918, and worked for various temperance organisations. She became president of the Housewives' Association of Victoria in 1920 and president of the Federated Housewives' Association of Australia in 1923, working for a lower cost of living. From 1927 to 1928 she was president of the National Council of Women of Victoria, having assisted in the formation of the Victorian Women Citizens' Movement in 1922. She unsuccessfully ran for public office three times as an independent candidate: for Henty federally in 1922, Brighton at state level in 1928, and Martin federally in 1943. In 1927 she was one of the first female justices of the peace in Victoria.

Glencross moved to Sydney in 1928 after her appointment to the Commonwealth Film Censorship Board, but the Scullin government did not reappoint her in 1929. She presided over the Good Film and Radio Vigilance League of New South Wales but was left financially insecure by her husband's death in 1930. In 1931 she worked for the National Association of New South Wales and the United Australia Party, and in 1938 was given a salary as chairwoman of the directors of the Housewives' Association of New South Wales, clashing frequently with Portia Geach.

Fighting off allegations of dictatorship, Glencross continued public life during World War II, serving on the state advisory committee of the Commonwealth Prices Commissioner, the council of the Lord Mayor's Patriotic War Fund and the executive of the Women's Voluntary National Register. Bankrupted by a defamation suit in 1946, Glencross died at Cremorne in 1950 and was buried in the Presbyterian section of Rookwood Cemetery.

In 1978 a street in the Canberra suburb of Chisholm was named Glencross Street in her honour, recognising her work as a social reformer.

References

1876 births
1950 deaths
Australian feminists
People from Sydney
19th-century Australian women
20th-century Australian women